Clément Desalle (born 19 May 1989) is a Belgian former professional motocross racer. He competed in the Motocross World Championships from 2006 to 2020. Desalle raced in the premier 450cc class for his entire motocross career, finishing second four times, third twice and fourth twice.

Motocross career
Born in La Louvière, Belgium, Desalle began competing in the premier MXGP class as soon as he became a professional racer in 2006. In his fourth season of competition, he won his first Grand Prix race in the Czech Republic and placed third in the 2009 FIM Motocross World Championship season riding for the LS Motors-Honda team. Between 2010 and 2013 would rank either second or third in the motocross world championships while riding for the Teka-Suzuki team run by Sylvain Geboers with former motocross world champion Eric Geboers as the team manager. Desalle was also a member of the victorious Belgian 2013 Motocross des Nations team that included Ken De Dycker and Jeremy Van Horebeek.

He joined the Kawasaki factory racing team in 2016. Descale announced his retirement in 2020 after 15 seasons.

GP wins 
 Loket (Czech Republic) 9 August 2009
 Canelinha (Brazil) 13 September 2009
 Agueda (Portugal) 9 May 2010
 Kegums (Latvia) 27 June 2010
 Fermo (Italy) 12 September 2010
 Sevlievo (Bulgaria) 10 April 2011
 Glen Helen (USA) 15 May 2011
 Agueda (Portugal) 12 June 2011
 Loket (Czech Republic) 7 August 2011
 Agueda (Portugal) 10 June 2012
 Uddevalla (Sweden) 1 July 2012
 Losail (Qatar) 2 March 2013
 Loket (Czech Republic) 4 August 2013
 Bastogne (Belgium) 18 August 2013
 Matterley Basin (Great Britain) 25 August 2013
 Arco di Trento (Trentino) 13 April 2014
 Talavera de la Reina (Spain) 11 May 2014
 St. Jean d'Angely (France) 1 June 2014
 Teutschenthal (Germany) 22 June 2014
 Assen (Netherlands) 28 August 2016
 Ernée (France) 28 May 2017
 Orlyonok (Russia) 11 June 2017
 Orlyonok (Russia) 1 May 2018

Season results 
2003: 9th 125cc French cadet class

2004: 9th 125cc French Junior class

2005: 5th 125cc Junior world championship
9th 125cc European championship

2006: 25th MX1 world championship
8th MX1 German championship

2007: 20th MX1 world championship
5th MX1 German championship

2008: 11th MX1 world championship
2nd MX1 German championship

2009: 3rd MX1 world championship
Pro open Belgian champion

2010: 2nd MX1 world championship

2011: 3rd MX1 world championship (missed three rounds due to injury)

2012: 2nd MX1 world championship

2013: 2nd MX1 world championship

2014: 4th MXGP world championship

2015: 10th MXGP world championship

2016: 8th MXGP world championship

2017: 4th MXGP world championship

2018: 3rd MXGP world championship

2019: 14th MXGP world championship (missed 11 rounds due to injury)

References

External links 
 Photos, videos & information on facebook

1989 births
Living people
People from La Louvière
Sportspeople from Hainaut (province)
Belgian motocross riders